Saint Chiaffredo (Chiaffredus, Theofredus, Ciafrè, Chaffre, Teofredo, Jafredo, Jafredus, Eufredus, Jofredus, Sinfredus, Zaffredus) is venerated as the patron saint of Saluzzo, Italy. Tradition considers him a member of the Theban Legion, but instead of being martyred with this legion at Agaunum (in present-day Switzerland), he escaped to Piedmont and was martyred there.

A 14th-century account relates that, around 522, a man fell from a precipice near Crissolo but remained unharmed. The local population attributed his being unharmed to relics discovered by a peasant plowing in the vicinity - a discovery attributed to divine intervention.  The mysterious skeleton was given the name of “San Ciafrè” and the tomb became the focus of a celebrated sanctuary at Crissolo.

The first documentary evidence pointing to a cult devoted to Chiaffredo dates from 1387, when Avignon Pope Clement VII granted indulgences to those who visited the church at Crissolo and helped in its repair.  A late 16th century legend written down by Guglielmo Baldesano states that Chiaffredo or Teofredo, soldier of the Theban Legion, escaped to Piedmont to avoid sacrificing to pagan idols and was martyred at Crissolo around 270.  Fabio Arduino believes this story to have no historical foundation, as it would have been unlikely for a Roman legionary of the 3rd century to bear such a clearly Germanic name.  The name is a variant of Theudofridus, derived from the Germanic theuda- "people," and frithu- "peace."

The sepulcher identified as the saint's burial place may have been a tomb of pagan origins.  Similar to the cults of Saint Constantius at Crissolo, Saint Bessus at Val Soana, Saint Tegulus at Ivrea, Saint Magnus at Castelmagno, and Saint Dalmatius at Borgo San Dalmazzo, the cult of Saint Chiaffredo was linked with that of the Theban Legion to lend antiquity to a local saint about whom nothing was really known.  
 
In 1902, a scholar identified Chiaffredo as the 8th century figure St. Theofredus (Chaffre, Theofrid, Teofredo), abbot of Le Monastier near Puy-en-Velay, who was killed by Muslim raiders and was also venerated in Piedmont.

Monsignor Tornabuoni, bishop of Saluzzo, declared Chiaffredo patron of his diocese during a synod of 1516, with Saint Constantius (San Costanzo) as co-patron.  Chiaffredo's relics were translated to Revello in 1593, and thence to the cathedral of Saluzzo in 1642.  Constantius and Chiaffredo are depicted together in the altar of Saluzzo Cathedral.

Chiaffredo enjoyed veneration in Piedmont; one English scholar has written that “beneath the shadow of Monte Viso, San Chiaffredo, a runaway apostle of the Theban legion, has usurped the worship paid in old time to the river-god Eridanus..."

Due to his alleged Theban origins, he is venerated by the Coptic Church.  He is however, not mentioned explicitly in the Roman Martyrology, although this martyrology includes Saint Maurice and the Theban Legion as a whole, without naming Chiaffredo specifically.

References

External links
 San Chiaffredo di Saluzzo 

286 deaths
3rd-century Christian martyrs
Christian folklore
Saints from Roman Egypt
Year of birth unknown